Married in Haste is a 1919 American silent comedy film directed by Arthur Rosson and starring Albert Ray, Elinor Fair and Robert Klein.

Cast
Albert Ray as Sam Morgan
Elinor Fair as Constance Winwood
Robert Klein as Agramonte
Don Bailey as Brown
Bowditch M. Turner as Hernandez 
Thomas Jefferson as Downer
William A. Carroll as The Valet 
William Elmer as Chauffeur

References

External links

1919 comedy films
American silent feature films
Silent American comedy films
American black-and-white films
Fox Film films
Films directed by Arthur Rosson
1910s American films